Eldar Rønning (born 11 June 1982 in Levanger) is a Norwegian former cross-country skier. He skis with the Skogn IL club, in Nord-Trøndelag.

Career
In 2004/05, he achieved three podium finishes in World Cup Sprint events, including a win at Reit im Winkl. He finished the season in 10th, 235 points behind overall winner Axel Teichmann. He was 62nd in the distance standings, 520 points behind Teichmann, and came second in the sprint discipline, 237 points behind fellow countryman Tor Arne Hetland. He also came second in the sprint discipline at the Norwegian national championships.

Rønning shared the 2005/06 season between the World Cup and the Scandinavian Cup, competing almost exclusively in sprints. He only competed in one World Cup race that was not either a sprint or a pursuit, it was a 15 km classic style race in Davos, Rønning finished 30th, 1:25.9 behind winner Jens Arne Svartedal. His best World Cup result was a third place achieved in a classic sprint in Drammen, a race in which the top four were Norwegian, and was won again by Svartedal. Rønning also came fifth twice, both in sprints, his only other race in the World Cup when he finished inside the top 20, was a 16th place in a sprint, in Oberstdorf. Rønning finished the season in 11th place in the FIS World Cup overall standings, 474 points behind German Tobias Angerer. Rønning was 28th in the distance standings, 671 points behind Angerer, and 7th in the sprint standings, 349 points behind sprint winner Björn Lind.

Rønning has won six World Cup races (15 km classical – three times, classical sprint – twice, and freestyle sprint) and three World Cup stages (all in Tour de Ski, 30 km classical mass start, 20 km classical mass start, classical sprint). In addition he has eight individual World Cup podiums.

Rønning has earned six medals at the FIS Nordic World Ski Championships with four golds (4 × 10 km relay 2007, 2009, 2011, 2013), one silver (15 km classical 2011) and a bronze (classical sprint 2007).

Cross-country skiing results
All results are sourced from the International Ski Federation (FIS).

Olympic Games

World Championships
 6 medals – (4 gold, 1 silver, 1 bronze)

World Cup

Season standings

Individual podiums
 11 victories (7 , 4 ) 
 24 podiums (15 , 9 )

Team podiums
 8 victories – (6 , 2 ) 
 20 podiums – (13 , 7 )

Personal life
He is married to fellow cross-country skier Laila Selbæk Rønning.

References

External links
 

1982 births
Norwegian male cross-country skiers
Cross-country skiers at the 2010 Winter Olympics
Cross-country skiers at the 2014 Winter Olympics
Olympic cross-country skiers of Norway
FIS Nordic World Ski Championships medalists in cross-country skiing
People from Levanger
Living people
Holmenkollen medalists
Tour de Ski skiers
Sportspeople from Trøndelag